Martine Martinel (born 26 September 1953) was a member of the National Assembly of France from 2007 to 2017.  She represented Haute-Garonne's 4th constituency, as a member of the Socialiste, radical, citoyen et divers gauche.

On 28 February 2013, The Commission des affaires culturelles et de l’éducation, of which Martinel was part, voted in favour of an amendment proposed by Martine Faure, and favoured by Yves Durand, Marie-George Buffet and Martinel among others, that replaced the biological concepts of "sex", with the sociological concepts of "gender" in the national elementary curriculum. The elementary curriculum was successfully revised in September 2013 under the name "l'ABCD de l'egalite".

External Links
 Her page on the National Assembly website

References

1953 births
Living people
Women members of the National Assembly (France)
Deputies of the 13th National Assembly of the French Fifth Republic
Deputies of the 14th National Assembly of the French Fifth Republic
21st-century French women politicians